"Köppäbävisan" is a song written and recorded by Bengt Pegefelt, releasing it as a single in 1980, scoring a major hit in Sweden topping the Swedish singles chart between 8 May-5 June 1981. The song also charted at Svensktoppen for 10 weeks between 5 April-14 June (in a time where no song was allowed to chart longer than 10 weeks), and even topped the chart.

Written in Borlänge Dialect, the lyrics deals with a person threatening to jump into the Dal River if not getting a sausage. "Köppäbä" is a reference to the old name of Falun, Kopparberget, and not Kopparberg, as often believed.

In 1981, the song was recorded by Curt Haagers on the album Santa Maria, and also for the children's album, Smurfarnas bästa.

Charts

References 

Curt Haagers songs
Number-one singles in Sweden
1980 singles
Swedish songs
Swedish-language songs
1980 songs